Veera Theerapattranon (born 13 April 1957), better known as Veera Theerapat (วีระ ธีรภัทร) is a Thai journalist, radio presenter, news TV host, and author. He became known for his talk radio shows during the late 1990s to early 2000s, where he used a shock jock–style, speaking bluntly and often ridiculing callers.

Early life
Veera grew up in Phichit Province. He graduated secondary school from Suankularb Wittayalai School. He earned a bachelor's degree from the Faculty of Political Science, Thammasat University. He got a job in the media immediately following graduation in 1979.

Career 
He was one of the journalists that followed Prime Minister Gen Prem Tinsulanonda on visits to foreign countries such as Japan.

He was an assistant foreign news editor of Matichon including serving as editor-in-chief of Wattajak. He was the president of The Economic Reporters Association between 1988 and 1989.

In 1995, he became the Daily News's first economics editor.

In late 1998, he became known as a radio host for "Khui Kan Chan Thueng Sook" (คุยกันจันทร์ถึงศุกร์, "talk Monday to Friday") on Trinity Radio (now Family Radio). The program allows phone-in listeners to come and talk to the host. He speaks loudly and argues with his audience. During his show's peak popularity (circa 1999), it is an afternoon radio program that was not the highest rating music program on FM in Thailand.

With increasing age causing reducing his aggressiveness, he began to offer more diverse content, such as history or narrating Indian epic Mahabharata.

Personal life 
He married.

Partial works

Television
Ban Lake Thee Ha (บ้านเลขที่ 5) on Channel 5 (2004)
Siam Chao Nee (Siam Today) (สยามเช้านี้) on Channel 5 (2004)
Khui Kan Wan Yood (คุยกันวันหยุด) on Channel 5 (2004)
Ta Sawang (ตาสว่าง) on Channel 9 (2008)
Khui Rob Thit (คุยรอบทิศ) on Channel 9 (– 2021)
Fang Hu Wai Hu (ฟังหูไว้หู) on Channel 9 (– present)
Khui Khai Kid (คุยให้คิด) on Thai PBS (2022 – present)

Radio
Pak Thong Chao Ban (ปากท้องชาวบ้าน) on FM 101 MHz (1995)
Khui Kan Chan Thueng Sook (คุยกันจันทร์ถึงศุกร์) on FM 97.0 MHz (1998 – 2008)
Ngoen Thong Tong Ru (เงินทองต้องรู้) on FM 90.5 MHz 
Khao Pen Khao (ข่าวเป็นข่าว) on FM 105 MHz (2008) 
Talk News & Music (คุยได้คุยดี) on FM 96.5 MHz (2008 – present)

Written

Column 
Pak Thong Chao Ban (ปากท้องชาวบ้าน) on Daily News
Pak Thong Khong Rao (ปากท้องของเรา) on Krungthep Turakij (Bangkokbiznews)
Ngoen Thong Tong Ru (เงินทองต้องรู้) on Kom Chad Luek
Hom Pak Hom Kho (หอมปากหอมคอ) on Kom Chad Luek

Book 
Lok Haeng Chiwit & Bantuek Haeng Chiwit (โลกแห่งชีวิต และ บันทึกแห่งชีวิต) (2 volumes) (1981) (translation of Hugh Prather's I Touch the Earth, the Earth Touches Me, under the pen name Waraporn)
Lao Tao Tee Ru (เล่าเท่าที่รู้) (2009)
The Story From The Epic Mahabharata (เรื่องเล่าจากมหากาพย์มหาภารตะ) (4 volumes) (2010)
Khon Rai Rak (คนไร้ราก) (autobiography) (2018)
On Painting (On Painting เห็นมากับตาว่าด้วยภาพเขียน) (2020)
The Story From Arsom Sonthaya (เรื่องเล่าจากอาศรมสนธยา) (2021) 
From Pompey To Caesar (จากปอมปีย์ถึงซีซาร์) (2 volumes) (2022)

Notes

living people
1957 births
Veera Theerapat
Veera Theerapat
Veera Theerapat
Veera Theerapat
Veera Theerapat
Veera Theerapat
Veera Theerapat